This page provides the summaries of the AFC second round matches for the 2010 FIFA World Cup qualification.

Format
Among the 19 winners of the first round, the 11 highest ranked teams (according to the first round seeding) received a bye and advanced to the third round of the Asian qualifiers (along with the five teams directly seeded to the third round). The eight remaining first round winners played in this round. Those ranked 16–19 were randomly drawn against teams ranked 12–15, and the draw (which allocated positions in the draw by seeding only) took place on 6 August 2007 in the AFC House in Kuala Lumpur, Malaysia.

Matches

Turkmenistan won 3–0 on aggregate.

Syria won 11–1 on aggregate.

Singapore won 3–1 on aggregate.

Thailand won 2–1 on aggregate.

Goalscorers
There were 22 goals scored in 8 games, for an average of 2.75 goals per game.

Players in bold advanced to the next round in qualifying.
4 goals
 Zyad Chaabo
 Raja Rafe

2 goals
 Aleksandar Đurić
 Sarayoot Chaikamdee

1 goal
 Budi Sudarsono
 Noh Alam Shah
 Feras Esmaeel
 Mohamed Al Zeno
 Jehad Al Hussain
 Jamshed Ismailov
 Mekan Nasyrow
 Wladimir Baýramow
 Arif Mirzoyev
 Ali Al Nono

References

2010 FIFA World Cup qualification (AFC)
2007 in Asian football
2007–08 in Hong Kong football
2007 in Turkmenistani football
2007–08 in Indonesian football
2007–08 in Syrian football
2007 in Singaporean football
2007 in Tajikistani football
2007 in Thai football
2007–08 in Yemeni football